Spiraxidae is a family of predatory air-breathing land snails, terrestrial pulmonate gastropods in the superfamily Testacelloidea (according to the taxonomy of the Gastropoda by Bouchet & Rocroi, 2005).

Distribution 
The distribution of this family is Neotropical.

Taxonomy

2005 taxonomy 
The family Spiraxidae is classified within the informal group Sigmurethra, itself belonging to the clade Stylommatophora within the clade Eupulmonata (according to the taxonomy of the Gastropoda by Bouchet & Rocroi, 2005).

The family Spiraxidae consists of the following subfamilies:
 Spiraxinae H. B. Baker, 1939
 Micromeninae Schileyko, 2000

2010 taxonomy 
Thompson (2010) redefined subfamilies in the Spiraxidae, moving Euglandininae and Streptostylinae to become subfamilies of Spiraxidae. According to their work, there are three subfamilies within the Spiraxidae:

 Spiraxinae H. B. Baker, 1939 - including Micromena
 Euglandininae H. B. Baker, 1941
 Streptostylinae H. B. Baker, 1941

Apparently this system of classification is not universally accepted, as Fauna Europaea uses different systematics for the subfamily Euglandininae, still placing it within the family Oleacinidae.

Genera 
Genera in the family Spiraxidae include:

Subfamily Spiraxinae include seven genera:
 Mayaxis Thompson, 1995
 Micromena H. B. Baker, 1939 - this was the type genus of the subfamily Micromeninae
 Miraradula Baker, 1939
 Pseudosubulina Strebel & Pfeffer, 1882
 Rectaxis Baker, 1926
 Spiraxis C. B. Adams, 1850 - type genus of family Spiraxidae
 Volutaxis Strebel & Pfeffer, 1882

Subfamily Euglandininae
 Euglandina Crosse & P. Fischer, 1870 - type genus of the subfamily Euglandininae
 Guillarmodia H. B. Baker, 1941
 Pittieria von Martens, 1901
 Poiretia Fischer, 1883
 Varicoglandina Pilsbry, 1908
 Varicoturris Pilsbry, 1907

Subfamily Streptostylinae
 Myxastyla Thompson, 1995
 Oryzosoma Pilsbry, 1891
 Salasiella Strebel, 1877
 Strebelia Crosse & Fischer, 1868
 Streptostyla Shuttleworth, 1852 - type genus of the subfamily Streptostylinae

Ecology 
These land snails are carnivorous and predatory.

References

External links